Ink wash painting (or) is a type of Chinese ink brush painting which uses black ink, such as that used in Asian calligraphy, in different concentrations. It emerged during the Tang dynasty of China (618–907); it overturned earlier, more realistic techniques. It is typically monochrome, using only shades of black, with a great emphasis on virtuoso brushwork and conveying the perceived "spirit" or "essence" of a subject over direct imitation. Ink wash painting flourished from the Song dynasty in China (960–1279) onwards, as well as in Japan after it was introduced by Zen Buddhist monks in the 14th century. Some Western scholars divide Chinese painting (including ink wash painting) into three periods: times of representation, times of expression, and historical Oriental art. Chinese scholars have their own views which may be different; they believe that contemporary Chinese ink wash paintings are the pluralistic continuation of multiple historical traditions.

In China and Japan as well as much less so in Korea, ink wash painting formed a distinct stylistic tradition with a different set of artists working in it than from those doing other types of painting. In China especially it was a gentlemanly occupation associated with poetry and calligraphy. It was often produced by the scholar-official or literati class, ideally illustrating their own poetry and producing the paintings as gifts for friends or patrons, rather than painting for payment. 

In practice a talented painter often had a very useful advantage in climbing the bureaucratic ladder. In Korea, painters were less segregated, and more willing to paint in two techniques, such as mixing areas of colour with monochrome ink, for example in painting the faces of figures.

The vertical hanging scroll was the classic format; the long horizontal handscroll format tended to be associated with professional coloured painting, but was also used for literati painting. In both formats paintings were generally kept rolled up, and brought out for the owner to admire, often with a small group of friends. Chinese collectors liked to stamp paintings with their seals and usually in red inkpad; sometimes they would add poems or notes of appreciation. Some old and famous paintings have become very disfigured by this; the Qianlong Emperor was a particular offender.

In landscape painting the scenes depicted are typically imaginary or very loose adaptations of actual views. The  style of mountain landscapes are by far the most common, often evoking particular areas traditionally famous for their beauty, from which the artist may have been very distant. Including water, for example oceans and lakes is common.

Philosophy

East Asian writing on aesthetics is generally consistent in saying that the goal of ink and wash painting is not simply to reproduce the appearance of the subject, but to capture its spirit. To paint a horse the ink wash painting artist must understand its temperament better than its muscles and bones. To paint a flower there is no need to perfectly match its petals and colors, but it is essential to convey its liveliness and fragrance. It has been compared to the later Western movement of Impressionism. It is also particularly associated with the Chán or Zen sect of Buddhism, which emphasizes "simplicity, spontaneity and self-expression", and Daoism, which emphasizes "spontaneity and harmony with nature," especially when compared with the less spiritually-oriented Confucianism.

East Asian ink wash painting has long inspired modern artists in the West. In his classic book Composition, American artist and educator Arthur Wesley Dow (1857–1922) wrote this about ink wash painting: "The painter... put upon the paper the fewest possible lines and tones; just enough to cause form, texture and effect to be felt. Every brush-touch must be full-charged with meaning, and useless detail eliminated. Put together all the good points in such a method, and you have the qualities of the highest art". Dow's fascination with ink wash painting not only shaped his own approach to art but also helped free many American modernists of the era, including his student Georgia O'Keeffe, from what he called a "story-telling" approach. Dow strived for harmonic compositions through three elements: line, shading, and color. He advocated practicing with East Asian brushes and ink to develop aesthetic acuity with line and shading.

Technique, materials and tools
Ink wash painting uses tonality and shading achieved by varying the ink density, both by differential grinding of the ink stick in water and by varying the ink load and pressure within a single brushstroke. Ink wash painting artists spend years practicing basic brush strokes to refine their brush movement and ink flow. These skills are closely related to those needed for basic writing in East Asian characters, and then for calligraphy, which essentially use the same ink and brushes. In the hand of a master, a single stroke can produce considerable variations in tonality, from deep black to silvery gray. Thus, in its original context, shading means more than just dark-light arrangement: It is the basis for the  nuance in tonality found in East Asian ink wash painting and brush-and-ink calligraphy.

Once a stroke is painted it cannot be changed or erased. As a result ink and wash painting is a technically demanding art form requiring great skill, concentration, and years of training.

The Four Treasures is summarized in a four word couplet: "," "The four jewels of the study: Brush, Ink, Paper, Inkstone" by Chinese scholar-official or literati class, which are also indispensable tools and materials for East Asian painting.

Brush
The earliest intact ink brush was found in 1954 in the tomb of a Chu citizen from the Warring States period (475-221 BCE) located in an archaeological dig site  near Changsha. This primitive version of an ink brush found had a wooden stalk and a bamboo tube securing the bundle of hair to the stalk. Legend wrongly credits the invention of the ink brush to the later Qin general Meng Tian. Traces of a writing brush, however, were discovered on the Shang jades, and were suggested to be the grounds of the oracle bone script inscriptions.

The writing brush entered a new stage of development in the Han dynasty. First, the decorative craft of engraving and inlaying on the pen-holder appeared. Second, some writings on the production of writing brush have also survived. For example, the first monograph on the selection, production and function of a writing brush was written by Cai Yong in the eastern Han dynasty. Third, the special form of "hairpin white pen" appeared. Officials in the Han dynasty often sharpened the end of the brush and stuck it in their hair or hat for their convenience. Worshipers also often put pen on their heads to show respect.

During the Yuan and Ming dynasties Huzhou emerged a group of pen making experts, such as Wu Yunhui, Feng Yingke, Lu Wenbao, Zhang Tianxi, etc. Huzhou has been the center of Chinese brush making since the Qing dynasty. At the same time, there was many famous brushes in other places, such as the Ruyang Liu brush in Henan province, the Li Dinghe brush in Shanghai, and the Wu Yunhui in Jiangxi province.

Ink wash painting brushes are similar to the brushes used for calligraphy and are traditionally made from bamboo with goat, cattle, horse, sheep, rabbit, marten, badger, deer, boar and wolf hair. The brush hairs are tapered to a fine point, a feature vital to the style of wash paintings.

Different brushes have different qualities. A small wolf-hair brush that is tapered to a fine point can deliver an even thin line of ink (much like a pen). A large wool brush (one variation called the 'big cloud') can hold a large volume of water and ink. When the big cloud brush rains down upon the paper, it delivers a graded swath of ink encompassing myriad shades of gray to black.

Inkstick
Ink wash painting is usually done on rice paper (Chinese) or washi (Japanese paper) both of which are highly absorbent and unsized. Silk is also used in some forms of ink painting. Many types of Xuan paper and  do not lend themselves readily to a smooth wash the way watercolor paper does. Each brush stroke is visible, so any "wash" in the sense of Western style painting requires partially sized paper. Paper manufacturers today understand artists' demands for more versatile papers and work to produce kinds that are more flexible. If one uses traditional paper, the idea of an "ink wash" refers to a wet-on-wet technique, applying black ink to paper where a lighter ink has already been applied, or by quickly manipulating watery diluted ink once it has been applied to the paper by using a very large brush.

In ink wash paintings, as in calligraphy, artists usually grind inkstick over an inkstone to obtain black ink, but prepared liquid inks ( in Japanese) are also available. Most inksticks are made of soot from pine or oil combined with animal glue. An artist puts a few drops of water on an inkstone and grinds the inkstick in a circular motion until a smooth, black ink of the desired concentration is made. Prepared liquid inks vary in viscosity, solubility, concentration, etc., but are in general more suitable for practicing Chinese calligraphy than executing paintings. Inksticks themselves are sometimes ornately decorated with landscapes or flowers in bas-relief and some are highlighted with gold.

Xuan paper
Paper (Chinese: traditional 紙, simplified 纸;) was first developed in China in the first decade of 100 AD. Previous to its invention, bamboo slips and silks were used for writing material. Several methods of paper production developed over the centuries in China. However, the paper which was considered of highest value was that of the Jingxian in Anhui Province. Xuan paper features great tensile strength, smooth surface, pure and clean texture as well as a clean stroke; it has great resistance to crease, corrosion, moth, and mold. Xuan paper has a special ink penetration effect, which is not readily available in paper made in Western countries. It was first mentioned in ancient Chinese books Notes of Past Famous Paintings and New Book of Tang. It was originally produced in the Tang dynasty in Jing County, which was under the jurisdiction of Xuan Prefecture (Xuanzhou), hence the name Xuan paper. During the Tang dynasty, the paper was often a mixture of hemp (the first fiber used for paper in China) and mulberry fiber.

The materials used in Xuan paper are closely related to the geographical environment of Jingxian. The bark of the Pteroceltis tatarinowii, a common variety of elm, is used as the main material for the production of rice paper in this area. Rice and several other materials were later added to the recipe in the Song and Yuan Dynasties. In those dynasties bamboo and mulberry began to be used to produce rice paper as well.

The production of Xuan paper is about an eighteen-step process – taken in detail over a hundred steps may be counted. Some paper makers keep their process strictly secret. The process includes cooking and bleaching the bark of Pteroceltis tatarinowii and adding various fruit juices.

Inkstone
The inkstone is not only a traditional Chinese stationery device, but also an important tool of ink painting. It is a stone mortar used for the grinding and containment of ink. In addition to stones, inkstones can be made of clay, bronze, iron and porcelain. This device evolved from the friction tool used to rub dyes about six to seven thousand years ago.

History and artists

Chinese painters and their influence on East Asia

In Chinese painting, brush painting was one of the "four arts" expected to be learnt by China's class of scholar-officials. Ink wash painting appeared during the Tang dynasty (618–907), and its early development is credited to Wang Wei (active in the 8th century) and Zhang Zao, among others.

Tang, Song and Yuan Dynasties
Western scholars have written that before the Song Dynasty, ink wash was primarily used for representation painting, while in the Yuan Dynasty, expressive painting predominated. Chinese historical views have traditionally found it more appropriate to divide the general artistic features of this historical stage by the theory of Southern School and Northern School, as promulgated Dong Qichang in the Ming Dynasty.

Southern School and painters
Southern School of Chinese painting, often called "literati painting", is a term used to denote art and artists which stand in opposition to the formal Northern School  of painting. Representing painters are Wang Wei, Dong Yuan, and so on. The Southern School has had a profound impact on Japanese and Southeast Asian paintings.
Wang Wei (699–759), Zhang Zao ( or ) and Dong Yuan are important representatives of early Chinese ink wash painting of the Southern School. Wang Wei was a Chinese poet, musician, painter, and politician during the Tang dynasty, 8th century. Wang Wei is the most important representative of early Chinese ink wash painting. He believed that in all forms of painting, ink wash painting is the most advanced. Zhang Zao was a Chinese painter, painting theorist and politician during the Tang dynasty, 8th century. He created the method of using fingers instead of brush to draw ink wash painting.
Dong Yuan was a Chinese painter during the Five Dynasties (10th century). His ink wash painting style is considered by Dong Qichang to be the most typical style of Southern School.

Chinese ink wash painters such as Li Cheng (919–967), Courtesy name , Fan Kuan, courtesy name "Zhongli" and "Zhongzheng", better known by his pseudonym "Fan Kuan" and Guo Xi had a great influence on East Asian ink wash painting. Li Cheng was a Chinese painter of the Song dynasty. He was influenced by Jing Hao, Juran. Li Cheng has a profound impact on Japanese and Korean painters.
Fan Kuan was a Chinese landscape painter of the Song dynasty. He has a profound impact on Japanese and Korean paintings.
Guoxi was a Chinese landscape painter from Henan Province who lived during the Northern Song dynasty. One text entitled "The Lofty Message of Forest and Streams" is attributed to him.

As representatives of scholar painting (or "Literati Painting", the part of the Southern School), painters such as Su Shi, Mi Fu and Mi Youren, especially Muqi, had a decisive influence on East Asian ink wash painting. Su Shi (8 January 1037 – 24 August 1101), courtesy name Zizhan (Chinese: 子瞻), art name Dongpo (Chinese: 東坡), was a Chinese poet, writer, politician, calligrapher, painter, pharmacologist, and gastronome of the Song dynasty.
Mi Fu (also given as Mi Fei, 1051–1107) was a Chinese painter, poet, and calligrapher born in Taiyuan during the Song dynasty.
Mi Youren (1074–1153) was a Chinese painter, poet, and calligrapher born in Taiyuan during the Song dynasty. He was the eldest son of Mi Fu.
Muqi (Japanese: Mokkei; 1210?–1269?), also known as Fachang, was a Chinese Chan Buddhist monk and painter who lived in the 13th century, around the end of the Southern Song dynasty (1127–1279). Today, he is considered to be one of the greatest Chan painters in history. His ink paintings, such as the Daitoku-ji triptych and Six Persimmons are regarded as essential Chan paintings. Muqi's style of painting has also profoundly impacted painters from later periods to follow, especially monk painters in Japan.

Four Masters of the Yuan dynasty is a name used to collectively describe the four Chinese painters Huang Gongwang (1269－1354), Wu Zhen (1280–1354), Ni Zan (1301–1374), and Wang Meng (王蒙, Wáng Méng; Zi: Shūmíng 叔明, Hao: Xiāngguāng Jūshì 香光居士) (c. 1308 – 1385), who were active during the Yuan dynasty (1271–1368). They were revered during the Ming dynasty and later periods as major exponents of the tradition of "literati painting", which was concerned more with individual expression and learning than with outward representation and immediate visual appeal.
Other notable painters from the Yuan period include Gao Kegong (1248–1310), also a poet, and was known for his landscapes, and Fang Congyi.

Northern School and painters
Northern School was a manner of Chinese landscape painting centered on a loose group of artists who worked and lived in Northern China during the Five Dynasties period that occupied the time between the collapse of the Tang dynasty and the rise of the Song. Representing painters are Ma Yuan, Xia Gui, and so on. The style stands in opposition to the Southern School of Chinese painting. Northern School has a profound impact on Japanese and Southeast Asian paintings.

Li Tang (courtesy name Xigu; c. 1050 – 1130) of the Northern School, especially Ma Yuan and Xia Gui's ink wash painting modeling and techniques have a profound influence on Japanese and Korean ink wash paintings. Li Tang was a Chinese landscape painter who practised at Kaifeng and Hangzhou during the Song dynasty. He forms a link between earlier painters such as Guo Xi, Fan Kuan and Li Cheng and later artists such as Xia Gui and Ma Yuan. He perfected the technique of "axe-cut" brush-strokes.
Ma Yuan was a Chinese painter of the Song dynasty. His works, together with that of Xia Gui, formed the basis of the so-called Ma-Xia school of painting, and are considered among the finest from the period. His works has inspired both Chinese artists of the Zhe School, as well as the great early Japanese painters Shūbun and Sesshū.
Xia Gui (fl. 1195–1225), courtesy name Yuyu, was a Chinese landscape painter of the Song dynasty. Very little is known about his life, and only a few of his works survive, but he is generally considered one of China's greatest artists. He continued the tradition of Li Tang, further simplifying the earlier Song style to achieve a more immediate, striking effect. Together with Ma Yuan, he founded the so-called Ma-Xia school, one of the most important of the period. Although Xia was popular during his lifetime, his reputation suffered after his death, together with that of all Southern Song academy painters. Nevertheless, a few artists, including the Japanese master Sesshū, continued Xia's tradition for hundreds of years, until the early 17th century.

Liang Kai was a Chinese painter of the Southern Song Dynasty. He was also known as "Madman Liang" because of his very informal pictures. His ink wash painting style has a huge influence on East Asia, especially Japan.
Yan Hui; was a late 13th century Chinese painter who lived during the Southern Song and early Yuan dynasties. Yan Hui's style of painting has also profoundly impacted the painters in Japan.

Ming and Qing Dynasties
Four Masters of the Ming dynasty are a traditional grouping in Chinese art history of four famous Chinese painters of the Ming dynasty. The group are Shen Zhou (1427–1509), Wen Zhengming (1470–1559), both of the Wu School, Tang Yin (1470–1523), and Qiu Ying. They were approximate contemporaries, with Shen Zhou the teacher of Wen Zhengming, while the other two studied with Zhou Chen. Their styles and subject matter were varied.

Xu Wei (1521–1593) and Chen Chun (1483–1544) are the main painters of the bold and unconstrained style of literati painting, and their ink wash painting is characterized by the incisive and fluent ink and wash. Their ink wash painting style is considered to have the typical characteristics of the Historical Oriental art. Xu Wei, other department "Qingteng Shanren", was a Ming dynasty Chinese painter, poet, writer and dramatist famed for his artistic expressiveness.
Chen Chun was a Ming Dynasty artist. Born into a wealthy family of scholar-officials in Suzhou, he learned calligraphy from Wen Zhengming, one of the Four Masters of the Ming dynasty. Chén Chún later broke with Wen to favor a more freestyle method of ink wash painting.

Dong Qichang (1555–1636) of the Ming Dynasty and the Four Wangs of the Qing Dynasty are representative painters of retro-style ink wash paintings that imitated the painting style before the Yuan Dynasty. Dong Qichang was a Chinese painter, calligrapher, politician, and art theorist of the later period of the Ming Dynasty. He is the founder of the theory of Southern School and Northern School in ink wash painting. His theoretical system has a great influence on the painting concept and practice of East Asian countries, including Japan and Korea.
Four Wangs were four Chinese landscape painters in the 17th century, all called Wang (surname Wang). They are best known for their accomplishments in  painting.They were Wang Shimin (1592–1680), Wang Jian (1598–1677), Wang Hui (1632–1717) and Wang Yuanqi (1642–1715).

Bada Shanren (born "Zhu Da"), Shitao (other department "Yuan Ji", 1642–1707) and Eight Eccentrics of Yangzhou are the innovative masters of ink wash painting in the late Ming and early Qing dynasties. Bada Shanren, other department "Bada Shanren", was a Han Chinese painter of ink wash painting and a calligrapher. He was of royal descent, being a direct offspring of the Ming dynasty prince Zhu Quan who had a feudal establishment in Nanchang. Art historians have named him as a brilliant painter of the period.
Shitao, born into the Ming dynasty imperial clan as "Zhu Ruoji" , was one Chinese landscape painter in early Qing Dynasty (1636–1912).
Eight Eccentrics of Yangzhou is the name for a group of eight Chinese painters active in the 18th century, who were known in the Qing Dynasty for rejecting the orthodox ideas about painting in favor of a style deemed expressive and individualist.

Xu Gu (1824–1896) was a Chinese monk painter and poet during the Qing Dynasty. His ink wash paintings give the audience a sense of abstraction and illusion.

Modern times
Modern and contemporary Chinese freehand ink wash painting is the most famous of the Shanghai School, and the most representative ones are the following painters. Wu Changshuo ( 12 September 1844 – 29 November 1927, also romanised as Wu Changshi), born Wu Junqing, was a prominent painter, calligrapher and seal artist of the late Qing Period. He is the leader of the Shanghai School. Wu Changshuo's style of painting has profoundly impacted the paintings in Japan.
Pu Hua was a Chinese landscape painter and calligrapher during the Qing dynasty. His style name was 'Zuo Ying'. Pu painted landscapes and ink bamboo in an unconventional style of free and easy brush strokes. He is one of the important representatives of the Shanghai School.
Wang Zhen (1867–1938), commonly known by his courtesy name Wang Yiting, was a prominent businessman and celebrated modern Chinese artist of the Shanghai School.
Qi Baishi (1 January 1864–16 September 1957) was a Chinese painter noted for the whimsical, often playful style of his ink wash painting works.
Huang Binhong (1865–1955) was a Chinese literati painter and art historian born in Jinhua, Zhejiang province. His ancestral home was She County, Anhui province. He was the grandson of artist Huang Fengliu. He would later be associated with Shanghai and finally Hangzhou. He is considered one of the last innovators in the literati style of painting and is noted for his freehand landscapes.

Important painters who have absorbed Western sketching methods to improve Chinese ink wash painting include Gao Jianfu, Xu Beihong and Liu Haisu, etc. Gao Jianfu (1879–1951; 高剑父, pronounced "Gou Gim Fu" in Cantonese) was a Chinese painter and social activist. He is known for leading the Lingnan School's effort to modernize Chinese traditional ink wash painting as a "new national art."
Xu Beihong (19 July 1895 – 26 September 1953), also known as "Ju Péon", was a Chinese painter. He was primarily known for his Chinese ink paintings of horses and birds and was one of the first Chinese artists to articulate the need for artistic expressions that reflected a modern China at the beginning of the 20th century. He was also regarded as one of the first to create monumental oil paintings with epic Chinese themes – a show of his high proficiency in an essential Western art technique. He was one of the four pioneers of Chinese modern art who earned the title of "The Four Great Academy Presidents".
Liu Haisu (16 March 1896 – 7 August 1994) was a prominent 20th century Chinese painter and a noted art educator. He excelled in Chinese painting and oil painting. He was one of the four pioneers of Chinese modern art who earned the title of "The Four Great Academy Presidents".

Pan Tianshou, Zhang Daqian and Fu Baoshi are important ink wash painters who stick to the tradition of Chinese classical Literati Painting. Pan Tianshou (1897–1971) was a Chinese painter and art educator. Pan was born in Guanzhuang, Ninghai County, Zhejiang Province, and graduated from Zhejiang First Normal School (now Hangzhou High School). He studied Chinese traditional painting with Wu Changshuo. Later he created his own ink wash painting style and built the foundation of Chinese traditional painting education. He was persecuted during the Cultural Revolution until his death in 1971.
Zhang Daqian (10 May 1899 – 2 April 1983) was one of the best-known and most prodigious Chinese artists of the 20th century. In addition, he is regarded as one of the most gifted master forgers of the 20th century.
Fu Baoshi (1904–1965), was a Chinese painter. He also taught in the Art Department of Central University (now Nanjing University). His works of landscape painting employed skillful use of dots and inking methods, creating a new technique encompassing many varieties within traditional rules.

Shi Lu (1919–1982), born "Feng Yaheng", was a Chinese painter, wood block printer, poet and calligrapher. He based his pseudonym on two artists who greatly influenced him, the landscape painter Shitao and writer Lu Xun. He created two different ink wash painting styles.

Other countries in East Asia
Since the Tang Dynasty, Japan, Korea, and East Asian countries have extensively studied Chinese painting and ink wash painting. Josetsu who immigrated to Japan from China has been called the "Father of Japanese ink painting". East Asian styles have mainly developed from the painting styles of Southern School and Northern School.

Japan
In Japan, the style was introduced in the 14th century, during the Muromachi period (1333–1573) through Zen Buddhist monasteries, and in particular Josetsu, a painter who immigrated from China and taught the first major early painter Tenshō Shūbun (d. ). Both he and his pupil Sesshū Tōyō (1420–1506) were monks, although Sesshū eventually left the clergy, and spent a year or so in China in 1468–69. By the end of the period the style had been adopted by several professional or commercial artists, especially from the large Kanō school founded by Kanō Masanobu (1434–1530); his son Kanō Motonobu was also very important. In the Japanese way, the most promising pupils married daughters of the family, and changed their names to Kanō. The school continued to paint in the traditional Japanese  and other coloured styles as well.

A Japanese innovation of the Azuchi–Momoyama period (1568–1600) was to use the monochrome style on a much larger scale in  folding screens, often produced in sets so that they ran all round even large rooms. The  of about 1595 is a famous example; only some 15% of the paper is painted.

 was one of the first suiboku (ink wash) style Zen Japanese painters in the Muromachi Period (15th century). He was probably also a teacher of Tenshō Shūbun at the Shōkoku-ji monastery in Kyoto.  A Chinese immigrant, he was naturalised in 1470 and is known as the "Father of Japanese ink painting".

Kanō school, a Japanese ink wash painting genre, was born under the significant influence of Chinese Taoism and Buddhist culture.  was the leader of Kano school, laid the foundation for the school's dominant position in Japanese mainstream painting for centuries. He was mainly influenced by Xia Gui (active in 1195–1225), a Chinese court painter of the Southern Song Dynasty. He was the chief painter of the Ashikaga shogunate and is generally considered the founder of the Kanō school of painting. Kano Masanobu specialized in Zen paintings as well as elaborate paintings of Buddhist deities and Bodhisattvas.
 was a Japanese Zen Buddhist monk and painter of the Muromachi period. He was deeply influenced by the Northern School of Chinese painting and Josetsu.
Sesshū Tōyō (Oda Tōyō since 1431, also known as Tōyō, Unkoku, or Bikeisai; 1420 – 26 August 1506) was the most prominent Japanese master of ink and wash painting from the middle Muromachi period. He was deeply influenced by the Northern School of Chinese painting, especially Ma Yuan and Xia Gui.
After studying landscape painting in China, he drew “秋冬山水図”.This painting　was drawn the landscape of Song dynasty in China.
He painted the natural landscape of winter.The feature of this painting is the thick line that represents the cliff.

 and  mainly imitated the ink wash painting styles of the Chinese Song Dynasty monk painter Muqi. Sesson Shukei was one of the main representatives of Japanese ink wash painting, a learned and prolific Zen monk painter. He studied a wide range of early Chinese ink wash painting styles and played an important role in the development of Japanese Zen ink wash painting. Colleagues of Chinese ink painter Muqi (active in 13th century) first brought Muxi painting to Japan in the late 13th century. Japanese Zen monks follow and learn the gibbon pictures painted by Chinese monk painter Muqi. By the late 15th century, the animal image of Muqi style had become a hot topic in large-scale Japanese painting projects.

The smaller, more purist and less flamboyant Hasegawa school was founded by Hasegawa Tōhaku (1539–1610), and lasted until the 18th century.
Hasegawa Tōhaku was a Japanese painter and founder of the Hasegawa school. He is considered one of the great painters of the Azuchi–Momoyama period (1573–1603), and he is best known for his byōbu folding screens, such as Pine Trees and Pine Tree and Flowering Plants (both registered National Treasures), or the paintings in walls and sliding doors at Chishaku-in, attributed to him and his son (also National Treasures). He was deeply influenced by Chinese painting of Song Dynasty, especially Liang Kai and Muqi.

The ink wash paintings of Mi Fu and his son had a profound influence on Japanese ink painters, and Ike no Taiga is one of them.  was a Japanese painter and calligrapher born in Kyoto during the Edo period. Together with Yosa Buson, he perfected the bunjinga (or nanga) genre. The majority of his works reflected his passion for classical Chinese culture and painting techniques, though he also incorporated revolutionary and modern techniques into his otherwise very traditional paintings. As a bunjin (文人, literati, man of letters), Ike was close to many of the prominent social and artistic circles in Kyoto, and in other parts of the country, throughout his lifetime.

Korea
In Korea, the Dohwaseo or court academy was very important, and most major painters came from it, although the emphasis of the academy was on realistic decorative works and official portraits, so something of a break from this was required. However the high official and painter Gang Se-hwang and others championed amateur literati or  painting in the Chinese sensibility. Many painters made both Chinese-style landscapes and genre paintings of everyday life, and there was a tradition of more realistic landscapes of real locations, as well as mountains as fantastical as any Chinese paintings, for which the Taebaek Mountains along the eastern side of Korea offered plenty of inspiration.

An Gyeon was a painter of the early Joseon period. He was born in Jigok, Seosan, Chungcheongnam-do. He entered royal service as a member of the Dohwaseo, the official painters of the Joseon court, and drew  (몽유도원도) for Prince Anpyeong in 1447 which is currently stored at Tenri University. He was deeply influenced by the Southern School of Chinese painting, especially Li Cheng and Guo Xi.

Byeon Sang-byeok was a Korean painter of the Miryang Byeon clan during the late period of the Korean Joseon Dynasty (1392–1910). Byeon is famous for his precise depictions of animals and people in detailed brushwork. Byeon was deeply influenced by the Court Painting of Chinese painting, especially Huang Quan.

The Korean painters influenced by Northern School in Song Dynasty include Gang Hui-an, Kim Hong-do, Jang Seung-eop and so on. He was good at poetry, calligraphy, and painting. He entered royal service by passing gwageo in 1441 under the reign of king Sejong (1397–1418–1450). 
Kim Hong-do (김홍도, born 1745, died 1806?–1814?), also known as "Kim Hong-do", most often styled "Danwon" (단원), was a full-time painter of the Joseon period of Korea. He was together a pillar of the establishment and a key figure of the new trends of his time, the  'true view painting'. Gim Hong-do was an exceptional artist in every field of traditional painting. His ink wash paintings of figures are deeply influenced by the Eight Eccentrics of Yangzhou.
Jang Seung-eop (1843–1897) (commonly known by his pen name "Owon") was a painter of the late Joseon Dynasty in Korea.  His life was dramatized in the award-winning 2002 film Chi-hwa-seon directed by Im Kwon-taek.  He was one of the few painters to hold a position of rank in the Joseon court.

Jeong Seon (1676–1759) was a Korean landscape painter, also known by his pen name "Kyomjae" ("humble study"). His works include ink and oriental water paintings, such as Inwangjesaekdo (1751), Geumgang jeondo (1734), and Ingokjeongsa (1742), as well as numerous "true-view" landscape paintings on the subject of Korea and the history of its culture. He is counted among the most famous Korean painters. His style is realistic rather than abstract.

See also
Bird-and-flower painting
Daoism
Dhyāna in Buddhism
Four Gentlemen

Ink-wash animation
Cantonese school of painting
Modern European Ink Painting
Northern School
Shanghai School

Southern School
Wash (visual arts)

Notes

References
Cihai Editorial Committee (辭海編輯委員會), Cihai, Shanghai: Shanghai Lexicographical Publishing House (上海辭書出版社), 1979. 
Max Loehr, The Great Painters of China, Oxford: Phaidon Press, 1980. 
Dunn, Michael, The Art of East Asia, ed. Gabriele Fahr-Becker, Könemann, Volume 2, 1998. 
Farrer, Anne, in Rawson, Jessica (ed). The British Museum Book of Chinese Art, British Museum Press, 2007 (2nd edn). 
 
Jenyns, Soame, A Background to Chinese Painting (with a Preface for Collectors by W. W. Winkworth), 1935, Sidgwick & Jackson, Ltd
Rawson, Jessica (ed). The British Museum Book of Chinese Art, British Museum Press, 2007 (2nd edn). 
Sickman, Laurence, in: Sickman L. & Soper A., The Art and Architecture of China, Pelican History of Art, Penguin (now Yale History of Art), 3rd ed 1971. LOC 70-125675
Stanley-Baker, Joan, Japanese Art, Thames and Hudson,  World of Art, 2000 (2nd edn). 
Little, Stephen; Eichman, Shawn; Shipper, Kristofer; Ebrey, Patricia Buckley, Taoism and the Arts of China, University of California Press, 2000-01-01.

External links

The Palace Museum
National Palace Museum
Shanghai Museum
James Cahill
Hasegawa Tohaku's  Pine Trees at the Tokyo National Museum
Sumi-e Beppe Mokuza, Inc.
Sumi-e Society of America, Inc.

Chinese art
Chinese painting
East Asian art
Japanese painting
Korean painting
Painting techniques
Zenga